Bush mill may refer to:
bush mill, a sawmill in the Australian bush
Bush Mill, a grist mill located in Scott County, Virginia
Bush Mill Railway
Bush Mill Stream Natural Area Preserve
Bushmills, a village in County Antrim, Northern Ireland